Émile Pelletier (11 February 1898, in Saint-Brieuc – 15 December 1975) was a Minister of State for Monaco. He was in office from 1959 to 1962.

References

1898 births
1975 deaths
Politicians from Saint-Brieuc
Ministers of State of Monaco
French interior ministers
French people of the Algerian War